Marko Marić may refer to:

 Marko Marić (footballer, born 1983), Croatian footballer, midfielder
 Marko Marić (footballer, born 1996), Croatian footballer, goalkeeper